HMS Sandwich was a 90-gun second rate ship of the line of the Royal Navy, launched on 14 April 1759 at Chatham.

Design and construction
Sandwich was a 90-gun second-rate Sandwich-class ship of the line. The class, of which Sandwich was the name ship, was designed by naval architect Thomas Slade. It was a stretched version of the standard design for a British 90-gun ship, allowing extra long guns to be placed on the gundecks of the ships, meaning that the quarterdeck had to hold less guns and the sailing qualities of the ships were improved. The design was approved for use on 12 November 1755. Sandwich had already been ordered by this point, having been done so on 28 October to Chatham Dockyard, where the ship would be built by shipwright John Lock.

Sandwichs fitting out was completed on 28 May, with construction having cost £54,770.

The ship held a crew complement of 750, with twenty-eight 32-pounder long guns on the lower deck, twenty-eight 18-pounders on the middle deck, and thirty 12-pounders on the upper deck. Additionally Sandwich held two 6-pounders on each of the quarterdeck and forecastle. The ship would continue with this armament unchanged, apart from the 6-pounders which were switched out with more 12-pounders in an Admiralty Order on 3 June 1790.

Service
Sandwich was commissioned in April 1759 under the command of Captain Henry Speke, joining the Western Squadron. Speke was replaced by Captain Richard Norbury in July, and at the same time Sandwich became the flagship of Rear-Admiral Francis Geary. The ship subsequently served in an expedition to Quiberon Bay in 1760, before joining the fleet of Admiral Edward Boscawen in the spring. Sandwich then took part in the Capture of Belle Île between 6 April and 8 June 1761, moving to the blockade of Basque Roads in the following year. Sandwich was paid off upon the end of the Seven Years' War in 1763.

Sandwich was brought back into service to become the guardship at Portsmouth in 1765. The ship was recommissioned by Captain Richard Edwards in November 1776, but became Portsmouth guardship again in February 1777. Subsequently, the ship was back at sea, fighting in the Battle of Ushant on 27 August 1778 before being again paid off in 1779. The ship received a refit between September and November of the same year at Portsmouth, being recommissioned at the start of that refit by Captain Walter Young to become the flagship of Admiral Sir George Rodney. In this capacity Sandwich joined the North America and West Indies Station. Tasked with relieving the Great Siege of Gibraltar, Rodney's fleet fought the Action of 8 January 1780 and Battle of Cape St. Vincent on 16 January before completing the first naval relief on 19 January. Sandwich subsequently sailed with Rodney to the West Indies, arriving there on 28 March.

Sandwich fought at the Battle of Martinique on 17 April, and in actions off St Lucia on 15 and 17 May. The ship then sailed to New York on 13 September, arriving on 22 September and arriving back in the West Indies on 12 December. On 3 February 1781 Sandwich took part in the Capture of Sint Eustatius, and in August of that year Young was replaced in command by Captain Sylverius Moriarty, who sailed the ship to Jamaica. There Sandwich became the flagship of Vice-Admiral Sir Peter Parker on the Jamaica Station.

Captain John Cowling replaced Moriarty in around May 1782, and Sandwich sailed back to England with Parker. There the ship was paid off in August. In October Captain John Frodsham took command, and Sandwich became the guardship at the Nore. The ship was paid off again in March 1783, continuing to lie at the Nore. Sandwich was then recommissioned to become a receiving ship at Sheerness in October 1787, with Captain Thomas Tonken in command. The ship was paid off in February 1788, but returned to duty as receiving ship in the Nore in May 1790, still under Tonken. At this time Sandwich was also flagship to Vice-Admiral John Dalrymple, Commander-in-Chief, The Nore. In October the ship moved to serve again as receiving ship at Sheerness before being recommissioned in December 1792 by Captain William Lockyer, who commanded her as guardship at the Nore.

In February 1793 Lockyer was replaced by Captain James Mosse, and Sandwich served in succession as the flagship of three Commanders-in-Chief, The Nore; Dalrymple again from March, Vice-Admiral Charles Buckner from August 1795, and Vice-Admiral Skeffington Lutwidge from July 1797. In September of the latter year Sandwich was paid off again, and recommissioned in November as a prison ship with the rating of a sloop. Based in the River Medway, the ship's next commander was Lieutenant Richard Hancock. Hancock was replaced in April 1798 by Captain Billy Douglas, who in turn handed over to Captain Abraham Guyot in April 1801.

Sandwich was paid off in April 1802 with the Peace of Amiens, but recommissioned in July 1803 with the start of the Napoleonic Wars under the command of Emmanuel Hungerford. Sandwichs final commander was Lieutenant Joseph Coxwell from 1809. The ship was broken up at Chatham in 1810.

Citations and references
Citations

References

 
 Lavery, Brian (2003) The Ship of the Line – Volume 1: The development of the battlefleet 1650–1850. Conway Maritime Press. .
 

Ships of the line of the Royal Navy
Sandwich-class ships of the line
1759 ships
Floating batteries of the Royal Navy